Merville is an unincorporated community in the Comox Valley between the City of Courtenay, Mount Washington, Dove Creek, and Black Creek near the east coast of Vancouver Island.  It was named by soldiers returning to the Island after fighting in France for Canada in World War I who named it after the place in France, Merville-Franceville-Plage, where the Canadians had their first field headquarters.

People from Merville 
 Emily St. John Mandel, novelist

Twin Town 
Merville-Franceville-Plage

References

Populated places in the Comox Valley Regional District
Unincorporated settlements in British Columbia
Designated places in British Columbia